The provost marshal general (pronounced "provo") is a United States Army staff position that handles investigations of U.S. Army personnel.  It is the highest-ranking provost marshal position in the U.S. Army, reporting to the Chief of Staff of the United States Army.  The position brings all aspects of law enforcement in the U.S. Army in a single office.

The role has been off and on since 1776 (usually in periods of war time).  After shutting down in 1974 at the end of the Vietnam War, it was resurrected on January 30, 2003, following the September 11 attacks.

It is responsible for:
United States Army Military Police Corps (since 2003)
United States Army Corrections Command (ACC) (since 2007)

Prior to its most recent organization, the responsibilities of this position were scattered across various army units.

History

American Revolutionary War
William Marony was the first provost marshal general, appointed by George Washington on January 10, 1776.  The principal job was maintaining jails and supervising 40 executions.  Nine men served as provost marshal general until 1778 when the duties were transferred to the Marechausse Corps.  Service ended at the end of the war.

American Civil War

James B. Fry was appointed on March 3, 1863, to be the first provost marshal general during the American Civil War.  The office dealt with recruitment and desertion issues.  It also supervised the Invalid Corps, in which disabled soldiers performed garrison duty (as opposed to field duty).  The position was abolished in 1866. An 1866 proposal to reorganise the Army to include a Provost Marshal's Bureau "consisting of a Provost Marshal General with the rank, pay and emoluments of a Brigadier General and an Assistant Provost Marshal General with the rank, pay and emoluments of a Colonel of Cavalry" was rejected on the grounds "that it creates an unnecessary office for an undeserving public servant".

Spanish–American War
Arthur MacArthur, Jr. was appointed provost marshal general of Manila in July 1901 to provide law enforcement in Manila and the provinces.  The position was abolished after about a year.

World War I
Enoch Crowder was appointed provost marshal general in July 1917 with the Provost Marshal General's Office focusing on enforcing the Selective Service System. In World War I, over 24,000,000 men filled out P.M.G.O. Form 1 Registration Cards for the military draft. During the American Expeditionary Force provost marshal generals oversaw military police, prisoner of war, criminal investigation, and circulation in Europe. Among the European marshals were Hanson E. Ely, William H. Allaire, John C. Groome III, and Harry Hill Bandholtz. The European component was dissolved in 1919 and the provost marshal general remained an advisor to the War Department until 1927.

World War II
The Basic Field Manual in 1937 outlined the position when it was reactivated.  Allen W. Gullion was appointed in 1941. Its duties initially were to control enemy aliens but were later expanded to do security clearance investigations and Military Police.  After 1943 it was responsible for prisoner-of-war camps in the United States as well as Japanese-American relocation camps.  Toward the end of the war it began investigating crimes and apprehending deserters and would handle the War Crimes Division of the Judge Advocate General's Office.

Post World War II
Gullion remained until April 1944 when he was succeeded by Archer L. Lerch, Blackshear M. Bryan in 1945, Edwin P. Parker Jr. in 1948, William H. Maglin in 1953, and Haydon L. Boatner in 1957.

Vietnam War
Ralph J. Butchers was appointed in 1960 followed by Carl C. Turner in 1964, Karl W. Gustafson in 1968 and finally Lloyd B. Ramsey in 1970 until the office was abolished on May 20, 1974.

War on Terror

After the start of Operation Iraqi Freedom, the position of provost marshal general was recreated.

List of provost marshals general

Here is the list of provost marshals general:

See also
 Provost Marshal's Office (United States Marine Corps)
 Masters-at-Arms (United States Navy)
 United States Air Force Security Forces
 USADIP

References

Provost
United States Army organization